Abdel Malek El-Aouad (born 23 April 1960) is a Moroccan former wrestler. He competed at the 1984 Summer Olympics and the 1992 Summer Olympics.

References

External links
 

1960 births
Living people
Moroccan male sport wrestlers
Olympic wrestlers of Morocco
Wrestlers at the 1984 Summer Olympics
Wrestlers at the 1992 Summer Olympics
Place of birth missing (living people)
20th-century Moroccan people